Pangio atactos is a species of cyprinid fish. It is endemic to Sumatra (Indonesia) and only known from the upper reaches of the Batang Hari River basin. It is a demersal species that occurs in both rivers and lakes.

Pangio atactos grows to  standard length.

References

Pangio
Cyprinid fish of Asia
Freshwater fish of Sumatra
Endemic fauna of Sumatra
Taxa named by Maurice Kottelat
Taxa named by Heok Hui Tan
Fish described in 2009